Gabriella Cilmi, an Australian pop singer, has released three studio albums, three extended plays (EPs), thirteen singles and seven music videos on record label Island. Cilmi's music spans a range of musical genres including pop, rock and soul.

Her debut single, "Sanctuary", was released in 2007 to digital download retailers only, with limited success. It did not appear on any national charts. Cilmi's second single "Sweet About Me" achieved worldwide chart success, reaching number-one in her native Australia, as well as the top ten in several countries. It has been said that Cilmi's further success following "Sweet About Me" was hindered because "most record buyers still only know her for one song." Following the high sales of "Sweet About Me", she released her first studio album Lessons to Be Learned, which reached the top ten in Australia, New Zealand and countries across Europe. Cilmi released four further singles from the album, including a re-release of "Sanctuary" and digital download-only single "Warm This Winter", which was released in the United Kingdom only after being used in a promotional campaign for Co-operative Food.

Cilmi's second album, Ten was released in March 2010 and was preceded by single "On a Mission", an upbeat dance-pop song, which reached the top ten of the UK Singles Chart. Cilmi also released two follow-up singles from the album titled "Hearts Don't Lie" and "Defender", respectively. "Magic Carpet Ride", used as a B-side on the "On a Mission" and "Defender" single releases, was also released as a double A-side promotional single with "Defender".

In March 2013, Cilmi released a free single, "Sweeter in History", followed by a commercially released single "The Sting" in September 2013 from her third studio album, The Sting. "Symmetry" was released as the album's second and final single on 11 November 2013. After a few years break she released "the Water" EP in 2019, which was promoted though the single "Ruins" also in 2019.

Albums

Studio albums

Extended plays

Singles

Promotional singles

Music videos

Other appearances 
Many of Cilmi's songs appear on albums and soundtracks by other artists but are also featured on her own releases, as album tracks or B-sides. The following have been officially released, but do not appear on any of Cilmi's own releases.

References 

General

Specific

External links 
 (domain now owned by finance company; December 2021)

Discographies of Australian artists
Rock music discographies
Pop music discographies
Rhythm and blues discographies